Estonian women's national under-17 football team represents Estonia in international youth football competitions.

FIFA U-17 Women's World Cup

The team has never qualified for the FIFA U-17 Women's World Cup.

UEFA Women's Under-17 Championship

The team previously never qualified for the UEFA Women's Under-17 Championship when Estonia was awarded the hosting rights to the 2023 championship on 19 April 2021.

See also
Estonia women's national football team

References

External links
Team at uefa.com
Team at Estonian Football Association

U17
Youth football in Estonia
Women's national under-17 association football teams